St. Julian's Church is an Orthodox church in Pushkin (Tsarskoye Selo), near Saint Petersburg in Russia. It was the church of His Majesty's Cuirassiers Life Guard Regiment.

History 
The church was built in 1899 and dedicated to St. Julian of Tarsus whose feast is on July 21.

The church was given back to the Orthodox Community in 1995.

Buildings and structures in Pushkin
Russian Orthodox church buildings in Russia
Churches completed in 1899
19th-century Eastern Orthodox church buildings
Russian Orthodox churches in Saint Petersburg
Cultural heritage monuments of federal significance in Saint Petersburg